Kai Po Che!: Brothers... For Life is a 2013 Indian Hindi-language buddy sports drama film directed by Abhishek Kapoor and produced by Ronnie Screwvala and Siddharth Roy Kapur under UTV Motion Pictures, marking the banner's first solo production under the Disney·UTV brand. Adapted from Chetan Bhagat's 2008 novel The 3 Mistakes of My Life, with a three-song soundtrack by Amit Trivedi and lyrics by Swanand Kirkire, the film stars newcomer Sushant Singh Rajput, Rajkummar Rao and Amit Sadh as the three main protagonists while Amrita Puri plays the female lead. The title is originally a Gujarati phrase that means "I have cut" which refers to Makar Sankranti (known as Uttarayan in Gujarat) where one of the competitors uses his kite to cut off another competitors' kite and yells the phrase.

Set in Ahmedabad from 2000 to 2012, Kai Po Che! revolves around three friends, Ishaan "Ish" Bhatt (Rajput), Omkar "Omi" Shastri (Sadh) and Govind "Govi" Patel (Rao), who want to start their own sports shop and sports academy; the film also revolves around the 2001 Gujarat earthquake, 2002 Godhra train burning and the 2002 Gujarat Riots. The film tracks their deep friendship, and innocence tarnished by religious politics and communal hatred. The film had a world premiere at the 63rd Berlin International Film Festival on 13 February 2013 where it was the first ever Indian film to feature in the World Panorama section.

The film grossed  worldwide, becoming a critical as well as commercial success. The film received six nominations at the 59th Filmfare Awards, including Best Director for Kapoor, Best Supporting Actor for Rao, Best Male Debut for Rajput, and Best Story. The film won two awards, including Best Screenplay for Kapoor and Best Background Score for Hitesh Sonik.

Plot

The film begins with Govind "Govi" Patel in 2012 giving a presentation in a school about the services provided by his sports club. Omkar "Omi" Shastri, in a parallel scene, is released from prison and Govi picks him up. While halting at a restaurant mid-way, Govi and Omi recall their days back to the year 2000 with the life of their friend Ishaan.

Ten years ago 

Ishaan "Ish" Bhatt is an ex-district level cricketer in 2000 who is a victim of politics in the cricketing selection fraternity, Omi is the nephew of a Hindu politician, Bishakh "Bittu" Joshi, who funds his father's temple and Govi is a geek with a penchant for business and numbers. Together they open a sports shop and an academy to train and promote talented budding cricketers. After toiling hard, they succeed in establishing it as a center for cricket among the local youth and start to incur profits.

Ishaan requests Govi to teach his sister Vidya "V" Bhatt mathematics for her upcoming exams. Govind is reluctant at first but agrees eventually. Vidya and Govi gradually become close to each other. Omi discovers the same and warns Govi of the consequences, as Ish is very protective of his sister.

The three friends spot a budding cricketing talent in a local boy, Ali Hashmi, who has a rare talent, and Ish starts training him vigorously. Govi is ambitious and wants to expand the budding business by opening a shop in a mall being constructed in Navrangpura, an upcoming part of the city. With financial help coming from Bittu, the trio secure the deal and set up shop in the mall. On 26 January 2001, disaster strikes when a destructive earthquake hits Gujarat and the mall is destroyed. Govi is shattered as the amount of money they invested was very large and they are now loaded with a huge debt. Omi is reluctantly forced to work for Bittu's right-wing party due to the money they owe him.

When relief camps of Bittu's party decline to give Muslims shelter in troubled times, Ish and Omi quarrel over their politico-religious outlook and temporarily break off their friendship. They again reunite after India's surprise win in the test match against Australia on 15 March 2001. Omi gets busy with religious politics and joins Bittu's party. Ish and Govi, meanwhile, are busy with Ali and Vidya respectively. Tension arises in the political sphere when Bittu loses the elections in his constituency to his opponent Subodh Mehta, who is supported by Ali's father Naseer Hashmi, a local Muslim leader. As a part of his party's campaign, in 2002, Bittu sends pilgrims (kar sevaks) to Ayodhya to the Ram Temple. Omi's parents are also among them; he has an emotional moment of reconciliation with his father before his leave. On the returning day, 27 February 2002, the shocking news of the Godhra train massacre reaches the people. Omi is shattered but Bittu convinces him to take revenge on the murderers of his parents.

Ish and Govi hide in Ali's house, fearing the communal riots which were about to start. As expected, the violence starts by sunset, and the mob led by Bittu storms into the Muslim locality, killing every Muslim in sight. A fight ensues between Naseer and Bittu, where Naseer fatally stabs Bittu in defense and rushes to save Ali and take shelter in their attic. Omi, enraged at Bittu's death, follows him with a gun. Meanwhile, Ish learns of Vidya and Govi's relationship, when he reads Vidya's text message in Govi's mobile phone about her periods. Enraged, he thrashes Govi while Omi enters the premises with a gun in hand, desperate to find and kill Ali and Naseer. Ish and Govi hurriedly try to stop Omi as he desperately searches for Ali and Naseer. Omi finally aims and shoots at Ali and Naseer. Ish in a bid to save Ali takes the bullet himself and consequently dies, leaving both his friends, father and Vidya devastated.

Present day 

The film then goes back to where it started, with Omi being released from prison. Govi and Vidya are married and have a son, whom they have named Ishaan after Ish. Vidya forgives Omi when he breaks down in front of her. The film ends with a now grown-up Ali debuting for the Indian cricket team against Australia. He plays his first shot by hitting the ball to the boundary with a cover drive just like Ish had taught him. Ish's spirit smiles at Ali's achievement and fades away smiling.

Cast

Production

Filming
Filming began in Vadnagar in Mehsana district of Gujarat along majority of scenes canned in old Ahmedabad and continued further in Porbandar, Diu. A scene featuring the trio was shot at Hatkeshwar Mahadev temple. One of the songs Meethi Boliyan was exclusively shot around Daman and Diu. Reportedly, Sushant Singh Rajput had to undergo four months cricket training under two coaches to fit into the book adapted character of 'Ishaan'. A cricket match sequence was shot at the Sabarmati Railway stadium sabarmati in Ahmedabad. The Board of Control for Cricket in India (BCCI) has granted the director permission to use footage from a historic India–Australia Kolkata test match from 2001 in Kai Po Che!. Director Abhishek Kapoor has admitted that the leading Bollywood stars didn't want to be a part of the film. Former cricketer Ajay Jadeja was signed for a special appearance in this film.

Title
Chetan Bhagat, whose book is adapted for the screen, first revealed the title of the film. Subsequently, a short contest was announced by him on Twitter to create awareness about the film and its title.

Soundtrack

The music of the film was composed by Amit Trivedi while the lyrics were penned by Swanand Kirkire. The background music has been composed by Hitesh Sonik.

Release
Kai Po Che! release date was confirmed as 22 February 2013. The film was released on 1000 screens in India. Kai Po Che! received 'U' certificate from the Censor Board prior to its release without any cuts, and released on 22 February 2013.

Marketing
The first trailer of this movie was released on YouTube on 20 December 2012, and was premiered along with Dabangg 2. The 3 Mistakes of My Life book cover was relaunched with the poster of Kai Po Che!

The director had a four-city promotional strategy. There were plans of bonding with friends in four cities and hanging out with them. Sushant Singh Rajput was to host a private screening of Kai Po Che! in his hometown of Patna for his childhood friends. On 18 February 2013, a star-studded premiere was organised in Cinemax, Versova, Mumbai.

Actors like Aamir Khan, Hrithik Roshan, Huma Qureshi, Arshad Warsi and film-maker Shekhar Kapur praised the film and acting performance.

Reception

Critical reception
The film was critically acclaimed by Indian critics but was met with a rather mixed reception from critics overseas.

India 
Sukanya Verma for Rediff.com gave 4/5 stars and says Abhishek Kapoor's clarity of vision makes Kai Po Che!, the adaptation of a mediocre novel, so irresistible. Taran Adarsh of Bollywood Hungama gave it 4 out of 5 and stated that the film is brimming with solid content. Meena Iyer of The Times of India gave it 4 out of 5 stars saying, "Kai Po Che! is very likeable. Between tears, you find yourself smiling, because it's the story of friendship and human triumph above all else." Resham Sengar of Zee News gave 4/5 stars stating, "The magic of the film lies in its details!" Saibal Chatterjee of NDTV gave 3.5 stars saying, "Kai Po Che! is a competently crafted, well acted and consistently engaging drama that makes its point without sinking into preachy paroxysms". Shubhra Gupta of The Indian Express gave 3.5/5 stars adding, "Abhishek Kapoor uses Kai Po Che! as an apt metaphor and crafts a lovely, emotional film on abiding friendship and the values that make life worth living." India Today gave 3.5 stars.

Khalid Mohamed of Deccan Chronicle gave 3 out of 5 stars and stated that it is a good film. Deccan Herald stated that it is a warm film while Live Mint said that Kai Po Che! is a well-crafted entertainer. Anupama Chopra of Hindustan Times gave the movie 4 out of 5 stars saying that "Kai Po Che! is Gujarati for "I've cut". It is used as a cry of victory in kite-flying contests. Here victory is hard-earned and tinged with tears and regret. But it's also deeply satisfying." Rajeev Masand of IBN Live gave the movie 4/5 stars saying that "It's only February, but one of the year's best films has arrived". The Hindu stated that the film is breathless.

Overseas 
The film is rated 78% 'fresh' on the review site Rotten Tomatoes. Critic Aaron Hillis of The Village Voice gave a negative review, stating that "The dramatic stakes are so puny that every obstacle can be overcome with a simple work-it-out montage, a cheap device prevalent enough in this movie to start a drinking game." Rachel Saltz of The New York Times wrote that the film "Mixes, not quite successfully, traditional Bollywood storytelling with something less conventional." Kate Taylor of The Globe and Mail wrote that the film "might be the next Bend It Like Beckham – if it did not have the sensibilities of the next Dr. Zhivago." Bruce Demara of the Toronto Star gave the a positive review of film 3.5 out of 4 stars. Through starting by criticizing the lengthy amount of Cricket portrayed in the film (which he describes as "a game that remains mystifying to North American audiences"), this aspect does not prevent Bruce from giving a Kai Po Che! a favorable review. He first praises the acting as what "makes film succeed – and occasionally soar", further describing it as "finely etched performances" with a "very fine cast". He further compliments the cinematography, stating that it shows "an India of contrasts, both sun-baked rural landscapes and chaotic urban scenes." He also states that the cinematography had "fine attention to detail" that provides the film "an air of authenticity". He then states that despite the film being 2-hour, the audience is "soon engaged and deeply invested in" it. He concludes his review by stating that even audiences with little knowledge of recent Indian history or the complexities of cricket "are going to find Kai Po Che a poignant and satisfying experience."

Robert Abele of the Los Angeles Times gave it a positive review, criticizing the film for its grimness and lack of subtlety, but complimenting the performances as "enjoyably boisterous", as well as complimenting the director Abhishek Kapoor for refusing to "linger on clichés for too long". Deborah Young of The Hollywood Reporter complimented the film for leaving the traditional Bollywood formula, by "boldly plunge[ing] into two major historical events: the 2001 earthquake that killed 18,000 people and... the violent Hindu-Muslim clashes of 2002." She also states that the Hindu-Muslim riot scene and subsequent reconciliation transforms the film into a "powerful drama" that "allows audiences to leave the theater with a tear in the eye". She later compliments the actors as "well cast" and praises the film's cinematography. Priya Joshi of the Digital Spy gave the film 4 out of 5 stars, describing the film as an "intimate story of friendship, ambition, love, loss and redemption. She further praises the film's storytelling, scripting, and cinematography as "cornerstones to this film", while complimenting the acting and characterization. She also praised the film's storyline, describing the tension of the rising action as a "shattering crescendo" by the climax. Her concluding message further commends the film: stating "thought-provoking, moving and ultimately heart-warming, Kai Po Che! is what great cinema is made of".

Russell Edwards of Special Broadcasting Service gave the film 3.5 out of 4 stars, introducing the film as "a hallmark of a well-made film is the way it can make you care about things you really care little about." He compliments the film for interlacing the film's narrative threads with real events, and concludes by stating the acting as "strong throughout". Daniel Eagan of the Film Journal International complimented the film, praising its authenticity by mentioning that it had moved "beyond Bollywood stereotypes to a new style of Indian cinema", further stating that the film "could attract an audience outside India". He praised the use of real situations mixed with the film's narrative, particularly complimenting the film's focusing on the character development during the events rather than overuse of special effects. He appreciated the film's use of "universal themes", and praised the way India was portrayed; describing this narrative on India as "on brink of the future, and yet still divided by wealth and poverty, by class and religion". He likewise admired the acting of the film, stating that all of the main characters "give strong performances". He completes his review by stating "this is a film whose scope, detail and appealing characters deserve a wide audience."

Box office
It grossed  after its first week.

After its successful run in domestic market, the film has done well overseas with a business of around $2.25 million in 17 days. Final overseas collection was US$2.325 million.

Accolades

Notes

References

External links

 
 

2002 Gujarat riots
2010s Hindi-language films
2010s buddy drama films
2010s disaster films
2010s sports drama films
Films about cricket in India
Films based on Indian novels
Films set in the 2000s
Films set in Ahmedabad
Films shot in Ahmedabad
Films shot in Gujarat
Indian buddy drama films
Indian disaster films
Indian sports drama films
UTV Motion Pictures films
Films shot in Daman and Diu
Films directed by Abhishek Kapoor
2013 drama films
2013 films